Chandra Shekhar Prasad Singh Gaharwar also known as C.S.P.Singh was a judge of the Allahabad High Court. He was the elder brother of V. P. Singh. He was the titular head of the Daiya zamindari and had the title of Raja Bhadhur. He was murdered along with his 15-year-old son during an evening drive by Dacoits in revenge for the anti-Dacoit operations launched by the then Chief Minister of Uttar Pradesh V. P. Singh. Only his youngest son Vikram Singh escaped death along with three other people including the heir to Shankargarh. V. P. Singh said that obviously his brother "paid the price of my office". Many believed that CSP Singh's assassination was the reason for V.P. Singh's resignation.

References

External links
List of Former Hon’ble Judges Allahabad High Court Website

Judges of the Allahabad High Court
20th-century Indian judges
1982 deaths
Year of birth missing